Joanna (6 November 1479 – 12 April 1555), historically known as Joanna the Mad, was the nominal Queen of Castile from 1504 and Queen of Aragon from 1516 to her death in 1555. She was married by arrangement to Philip the Handsome, Archduke of Austria, of the House of Habsburg, on 20 October 1496.  Following the deaths of her brother, John, Prince of Asturias, in 1497, her elder sister Isabella in 1498, and her nephew Miguel in 1500, Joanna became the heir presumptive to the crowns of Castile and Aragon. When her mother, Queen Isabella I of Castile, died in 1504, Joanna became Queen of Castile. Her father, King Ferdinand II of Aragon, proclaimed himself Governor and Administrator of Castile. 

In 1506 Archduke Philip became King of Castile jure uxoris as Philip I, initiating the rule of the Habsburgs in the Spanish kingdoms, and died that same year.  Despite being the ruling Queen of Castile, Joanna had little effect on national policy during her reign as she was declared insane and confined in the Royal Convent of Santa Clara in Tordesillas under the orders of her father, who ruled as regent until his death in 1516, when she inherited his kingdom as well. From 1516, when her son Charles I ruled as king, she was nominally co-monarch but remained confined until her death. Joanna's death resulted in the personal union of Spain and the Holy Roman Empire, as her son Charles V, Holy Roman Emperor, also became King of Castile and Aragon.

Early life

Joanna was born in the city of Toledo in the Kingdom of Castile. She was the third child and second daughter of Isabella I of Castile and Ferdinand II of Aragon, both members of the House of Trastámara. She had a fair complexion, brown eyes and her hair colour was between strawberry-blonde and auburn, like her mother and her sister Catherine. Her siblings were Isabella, Queen of Portugal; John, Prince of Asturias; Maria, Queen of Portugal; and Catherine, Queen of England.

Education
She was educated and formally trained for a significant marriage that, as a royal family alliance, would extend the kingdom's power and security as well as its influence and peaceful relations with other ruling powers. As an infanta (princess), she was not expected to be heiress to the throne of either Castile or Aragon, although through deaths she later inherited both.

Her academic education consisted of canon and civil law, genealogy and heraldry, grammar, history, languages, mathematics, philosophy, reading, spelling and writing. Among the authors of classical literature she read were the Christian poets Juvencus and Prudentius, Church fathers Saint Ambrose, Saint Augustine, Saint Gregory, and Saint Jerome, and the Roman statesman Seneca.

In the Castilian court her main tutors were the Dominican priest Andrés de Miranda; educator Beatriz Galindo, who was a member of the queen's court; and her mother, the queen. Joanna's royal education included court etiquette, dancing, drawing, equestrian skills, good manners, music, and the needle arts of embroidery, needlepoint, and sewing. She studied the Iberian Romance languages of Castilian, Leonese, Galician-Portuguese and Catalan, and became fluent in French and Latin. She learned outdoor pursuits such as hawking and hunting. She was skilled at dancing and music, having played the clavichord, the guitar, and the monochord.

Marriage

In 1496, Joanna, at the age of sixteen, was betrothed to the eighteen year old Philip of Flanders, in the Low Countries. Philip's parents were Maximilian I, Holy Roman Emperor, and his first wife, Duchess Mary of Burgundy. The marriage was one of a set of family alliances between the Habsburgs and the Trastámaras designed to strengthen both against growing French power.

Joanna entered a proxy marriage at the Palacio de los Vivero in the city of Valladolid, Castile, where her parents had secretly married in 1469. In August 1496 Joanna left from the port of Laredo in northern Castile on the Atlantic's Bay of Biscay. Except for 1506, when she saw her younger sister Catherine, the then Dowager Princess of Wales, she would not see her siblings again.

Joanna began her journey to Flanders in the Low Countries, which consisted of parts of the present day Netherlands, Belgium, Luxembourg, France, and Germany, on 22 August 1496. The formal marriage took place on 20 October 1496 in Lier, north of present-day Brussels. Between 1498 and 1507, she gave birth to six children, two boys and four girls, all of whom grew up to be either emperors or queens.

Princess of Castile
The death of Joanna's brother John, the stillbirth of John's daughter, and the deaths of Joanna's older sister Isabella and Isabella's son Miguel made Joanna heiress to the Spanish kingdoms. Her remaining siblings were Maria (1482–1517) and Catherine (1485–1536), younger than Joanna by three and six years, respectively.

In 1502, the Castilian Cortes of Toro recognised Joanna as heiress to the Castilian throne and Philip as her consort. She was named Princess of Asturias, the title traditionally given to the heir of Castile. Also in 1502, the Aragonese Cortes gathered in Zaragoza to swear an oath to Joanna as heiress; however, the Archbishop of Zaragoza expressed firmly that this oath could only establish jurisprudence by way of a formal agreement on the succession between the Cortes and the king.

In 1502, Philip, Joanna and a large part of the Burgundian court travelled to Toledo for Joanna to receive fealty from the Cortes of Castile as Princess of Asturias, heiress to the Castilian throne, a journey chronicled in great detail by Antoon I van Lalaing. Philip and the majority of the court returned to the Low Countries in the following year, leaving a pregnant Joanna in Madrid, where she gave birth to her and Philip's fourth child, Ferdinand, later a central European monarch and Holy Roman Emperor as Ferdinand I.

Reign

Queen of Castile

Succession
Upon the death of her mother in November 1504, Joanna became Queen regnant of Castile and her husband jure uxoris its king in 1506. Joanna's father, Ferdinand II, lost his monarchical status in Castile although his wife's will permitted him to govern in Joanna's absence or, if Joanna was unwilling to rule herself, until Joanna's heir reached the age of 20.

Ferdinand refused to accept this; he minted Castilian coins in the name of "Ferdinand and Joanna, King and Queen of Castile, León and Aragon," and, in early 1505, persuaded the Cortes that Joanna's "illness is such that the said Queen Doña Joanna our Lady cannot govern". The Cortes then appointed Ferdinand as Joanna's guardian and the kingdom's administrator and governor.

Joanna's husband, Philip, was unwilling to accept any threat to his chances of ruling Castile and also minted coins in the name of "Philip and Joanna, King and Queen of Castile, Léon and Archdukes of Austria, etc." In response, Ferdinand embarked upon a pro-French policy, marrying Germaine de Foix, niece of Louis XII of France (and his own great-niece), in the hope that she would produce a son to inherit Aragon and perhaps Castile.

In the Low Countries, Joanna was kept in confinement. When her father-in-law Maximilian (in semi secrecy) visited them on 24 August 1505 though, she was released to welcome him. Maximilian tried to comfort Joanna with festivities and she spent weeks accompanying him in public events, during which she acted like a wise, prudent queen, as noted by the Venetian ambassador. To entertain Joanna, Philip and Maximilian (who was dressed incognito) jousted against each other at night, under torchlight. Maximilian told Philip that he could only succeed as a monarch if husband and wife were "una cosa medesima" (one and the same). After this, the couple reconciled somewhat. When Philip tried to gain support from Castilian nobles and prelates against Ferdinand though, Joanna firmly refused to act against her father.

Ferdinand's remarriage merely strengthened support for Philip and Joanna in Castile, and in late 1505 the pair decided to travel to Castile. Before they boarded the ship, Joanna forbade a ship with woman attendants to join the trip, fearing that Philip would have illicit relationships with them. This action played right into Philip's and Ferdinand's propaganda against her. Leaving Flanders on 10 January 1506, their ships were wrecked on the English coast and the couple were guests of Henry, Prince of Wales, later Henry VIII, and Joanna's sister Catherine of Aragon at Windsor Castle. They weren't able to leave until 21 April, by which time civil war was looming in Castile.

Philip apparently considered landing in Andalusia and summoning the nobles to take up arms against Ferdinand in Aragon. Instead, he and Joanna landed at A Coruña on 26 April, whereupon the Castilian nobility abandoned Ferdinand en masse. Ferdinand met Philip at Villafáfila on 27 June 1506 for a private interview in the village church. To the general surprise Ferdinand had unexpectedly handed over the government of Castile to his "most beloved children", promising to retire to Aragon. Philip and Ferdinand then signed a second treaty secretly, agreeing that Joanna's "infirmities and sufferings" made her incapable of ruling and promising to exclude her from government and deprive the Queen of crown and freedom.

Ferdinand promptly repudiated the second agreement the same afternoon, declaring that Joanna should never be deprived of her rights as Queen Proprietress of Castile. A fortnight later, having come to no fresh agreement with Philip, and thus effectively retaining his right to interfere if he considered his daughter's rights to have been infringed upon, he abandoned Castile for Aragon, leaving Philip to govern in Joanna's stead.

Philip's death
By virtue of the agreement of Villafáfila, the procurators of the Cortes met in Valladolid, Castile on 9 July 1506. On 12 July, they swore allegiance to Philip I and Joanna together as King and Queen of Castile and León and to their son Charles, later Charles I of Castile, Leon and Aragon and Charles V, Holy Roman Emperor, as their heir-apparent. This arrangement only lasted for a few months.

On 25 September 1506, Philip died after a five-day illness in the city of Burgos in Castile. The probable cause of death was typhoid fever but there were rumors that his father-in-law, Ferdinand II, had poisoned him. Joanna was pregnant with their sixth child, a daughter named Catherine (1507–1578), who later became Queen of Portugal.

By 20 December 1506, Joanna was in the village of Torquemada in Castile, attempting to exercise her rights to rule alone in her own name as Queen of Castile. The country fell into disorder. Her son and heir-apparent, Charles, later Charles I, was a six-year-old child being raised in his aunt's care in northern European Flanders; her father, Ferdinand II, remained in Aragon, allowing the crisis to grow.

A regency council under Archbishop Cisneros was set up, against the queen's orders, but it was unable to manage the growing public disorder; plague and famine devastated the kingdom with supposedly half the population perishing of one or the other. The queen was unable to secure the funds required to assist her to protect her power. In the face of this, Ferdinand II returned to Castile in July 1507. His arrival coincided with a remission of the plague and famine, a development which quieted the instability and left an impression that his return had restored the health of the kingdom.

Father's regency

Ferdinand II and Joanna met at Hornillos, Castile, on 30 July 1507. Ferdinand then constrained her to yield her power over the Kingdom of Castile and León to himself. On 17 August 1507, three members of the royal council were summoned – supposedly in her name – and ordered to inform the grandees of her father Ferdinand II's return to power: "That they should go to receive his highness and serve him as they would her person and more." However, she made it evident that this was against her will, by refusing to sign the instructions and issuing a statement that as queen regnant she did not endorse the surrender of her own royal powers.

Nonetheless, she was thereafter queen in name only, and all documents, though issued in her name, were signed with Ferdinand's signature, "I the King". He was named administrator of the kingdom by the Cortes of Castile in 1510, and entrusted the government mainly to Archbishop Cisneros. He had Joanna confined in the Royal Palace in Tordesillas, near Valladolid in Castile, in February 1509 after having dismissed all of her faithful servants and having appointed a small retinue accountable to him alone. At this time, some accounts claim that she was insane or "mad", and that she took her husband's corpse with her to Tordesillas to keep it close to her.

Son as co-monarch
After the death of her father, Ferdinand the Catholic, on 23 January 1516, her then seventeen-year-old son Charles arrived in Asturias at the Bay of Biscay in October 1517. Until his arrival, her Crown of Aragon was governed by Archbishop Alonso de Aragon (a natural son of Ferdinand) and her Crown of Castile was governed by Cardinal Francisco de Cisneros. On 4 November, Charles and his sister Eleanor met their mother Joanna at Tordesillas – there they secured from her the necessary authorisation to allow Charles to rule as her co-King of Castile and León and of Aragon. Despite her acquiescence to his wishes, her confinement would continue. The Castilian Cortes, meeting in Valladolid, spited Charles by addressing him only as Su Alteza ("Your Highness") and reserving Majestad ("Majesty") for Joanna. However, no one seriously considered rule by Joanna a realistic proposition.

In 1519, Charles I now ruled the Kingdom of Aragon and its territories and the Kingdom of Castile and León and its territories, in personal union. In addition, that same year Charles was elected Holy Roman Emperor. The kingdoms of Castile and Aragon (and Navarre) remained in personal union until their jurisdictional unification in the early 18th century by the Bourbons, while Charles eventually abdicated as Emperor of the Holy Roman Empire in favour of his brother Ferdinand, and as King of Spain in favour of his son Philip, so dissolving the personal union between the Empire and the Spanish kingdoms that Joanna's marriage had established.

Revolt of the Comuneros
In 1520, the Revolt of the Comuneros broke out in response to the perceived foreign Habsburg influence over Castile through Charles V. The rebel leaders demanded that Castile be governed in accordance with the supposed practices of the Catholic Monarchs. In an attempt to legitimise their rebellion, the Comuneros turned to Joanna. As the 'on record' sovereign monarch, had she given written approval to the rebellion, it would have been legalised and would have triumphed.

In an attempt to prevent this, Don Antonio de Rojas Manrique, Bishop of Mallorca, led a delegation of royal councillors to Tordesillas, asking Joanna to sign a document denouncing the Comuneros. She demurred, requesting that he present her specific provisions. Before this could be done, the Comuneros in turn stormed the virtually undefended city and requested her support.

The request prompted Adrian of Utrecht, the regent appointed by Charles V, to declare that Charles would lose Castile if she granted her support. Although she was sympathetic to the Comuneros, she was persuaded by Ochoa de Landa and her confessor Fray John of Avila that supporting the revolt would irreparably damage the country and her son's kingship, and she therefore refused to sign a document granting her support. The Battle of Villalar confirmed that Charles would prevail over the revolt.

Forced confinement
Charles ensured his domination and throne by having his mother confined for the rest of her life in the now demolished Royal Palace in Tordesillas, Castile. Joanna's condition degenerated further. She apparently became convinced that some of the nuns that took care of her wanted to kill her. Reportedly it was difficult for her to eat, sleep, bathe, or change her clothes. Charles wrote to her caretakers: "It seems to me that the best and most suitable thing for you to do is to make sure that no person speaks with Her Majesty, for no good could come from it".

Joanna had her youngest daughter, Catherine of Austria, with her during Ferdinand II's time as regent, 1507–1516. Her older daughter, Eleanor of Austria, had created a semblance of a household within the palace rooms. In her final years, Joanna's physical state began to decline rapidly, with mobility ever more difficult.

Joanna died on Good Friday, 12 April 1555, at the age of 75 in the Royal Palace at Tordesillas. She is entombed in the Royal Chapel of Granada (la Capilla Real) in Spain, alongside her parents, Isabella I and Ferdinand II, her husband Philip I and her nephew Miguel da Paz, Prince of Asturias.

Disputed mental health claims
As a young woman, Joanna was known to be highly intelligent. Claims regarding her as "mad" are widely disputed. It was only after her marriage that the first suspicions of mental illness arose. Some historians believe she may have had melancholia, a depressive disorder, a psychosis, or a case of inherited schizophrenia. She may also have been unjustly painted as "mad" as her husband Philip the Handsome and her father, Ferdinand, had a great deal to gain from Joanna being declared sick or incompetent to rule.

The narrative of her purported mental illness is perpetuated in stories of the mental illness of her maternal grandmother, Isabella of Portugal, Queen of Castile, in widowhood exiled by her stepson to the castle of Arévalo in Ávila, Castile.

Legacy

Bethany Aram argues that while she seemed to be unable or unwilling to rule herself, Joanna's major (political) significance lay with her defense of the rights of her descendants and thus the Habsburg dynasty. While she did have affection for Philip, her refusal to bury her husband (and attempt to bring his corpse to Granada so that he would lie beside her mother) was likely an attempt to ward off suitors and create a connection between Charles and Castile. Facing the leaders of the Comunero Revolt, she again chose the Habsburg dynasty over her Castilian heritage. Her fecundity provided Charles with many Habsburg siblings (and by extensions, these siblings' children) who upheld his rule. Sara T. Nalle agrees with Aram that this was Joanna's major success, while pointing out that Aram seems to gloss over the fact that Joanna's contemporaries did see her as different. Nalle opines that overall, Joanna was a troubled individual who was also not trained for the political world, found herself surrounded by strong personalities, and had to face a shocking amount of cruelty and deceit.

Arms

Children

Ancestry

Notes

References

Bibliography
 Biographies
Prawdin, Michael, The Mad Queen of Spain (1939)
 Dennis, Amarie, Seek the Darkness: The Story of Juana La Loca, (1945)
 Prescott, William H., History of Ferdinand and Isabella (1854)
 Rosier, Johanna die Wahnsinnige (1890)
 Tighe, Harry, A Queen of Unrest: The Story of Juana of Castile, Mother of Charles V., Born 1479, Died 1555 (1907).
 Villa, R., La Reina doña Juana la Loca (1892)
 Aram, Bethany, Juana the Mad: Sovereignty and Dynasty in Renaissance Europe (Baltimore: Johns Hopkins University Press, 2005).
 Fleming, Gillian B., Juana I: Legitimacy and Conflict in Sixteenth Century Castile (London: Palgrave Macmillan, 2018).
 Assini, Adriana, Le rose di Cordova, Scrittura & Scritture, Napoli 2007
 Fox, Julia, Sister Queens: The Noble, Tragic Lives of Katherine of Aragon and Juana, Queen of Castile (New York: Ballantine Books, 2011).
 Bergenroth, G A. Introduction, Part 1, Calendar of State Papers, Spain; vol. 1, 1485–1509, (London, 1862), p. xlvii. British History Online http://www.british-history.ac.uk/cal-state-papers/spain/vol1

 Works cited
 Miller, Townsend, Castles and the Crown. Coward-McCann: New York, 1963
 Aram, Bethany, "Juana 'the Mad's' Signature: The Problem of Invoking Royal Authority, 1505–1507", Sixteenth Century Journal
 Elliott, J.H., Imperial Spain, 1469–1716
 de Francisco Olmos, José María: Estudio documental de la moneda castellana de Juana la Loca fabricada en los Países Bajos (1505–1506), Revista General de Información y Documentación 2002, vol. 12, núm. 2 (Universidad complutense de Madrid).
 de Francisco Olmos, José María: Estudio documental de la moneda castellana de Carlos I fabricada en los Países Bajos (1517); Revista General de Información y Documentación 2003, vol. 13, núm. 2 (Universidad complutense de Madrid).
 Juan-Navarro, Santiago, Maria Gomez, and Phyllis Zatlin. Juana of Castile: History and Myth of the Mad Queen. Newark and London: Bucknell University Press, 2008.

External links

 Biography of Juana the Mad of Castile (1479–1555) 
 

|-

|-

|-

1479 births
1555 deaths
15th-century Spanish women
16th-century Spanish women
16th-century women rulers
16th-century Castilian monarchs
16th-century Aragonese monarchs
16th-century Kings of Sicily
16th-century monarchs of Naples
16th-century Navarrese monarchs
Burials at the Royal Chapel of Granada
Monarchs of Majorca
Monarchs of Naples
Monarchs of Sicily
Counts of Barcelona
Queens regnant in Europe
Aragonese infantas
Castilian infantas
Princes of Asturias
Dukes of Montblanc
Austrian princesses
House of Trastámara
People from Toledo, Spain
People of the Revolt of the Comuneros
Spanish people of English descent
Spanish people of Portuguese descent
Spanish Renaissance people
Valencian monarchs
Royalty and nobility with disabilities
Queens regnant in Sardinia
Countesses of Flanders